The 248th Aviation Support Battalion (ASB) is a US Army National Guard battalion headquartered in Boone, Iowa.

Structure

 Headquarters Support Company at Davenport (IA ARNG)
 Detachment 1 at Boone (IA ARNG)
 Detachment 2 at Waterloo (IA ARNG)
 Company A at Waterloo (IA ARNG)
 Detachment 1 at Clinton (IA ARNG)
 Detachment 2 at Muscatine (IA ARNG)
 Company B at Boone (IA ARNG) 
 Detachment 2 at Sandston, VA (VA ARNG)
 Detachment 3 at Waterloo (IA ARNG)
 Detachment 4 at Davenport (IA ARNG)
 Company C (Signal) at Lexington Park, MD (MD ARNG)

References

AVN 248